Thaikkad is a census town in Thrissur district in the Indian state of Kerala.

Demographics
 India census, Thaikkad had a population of 7749. Males constitute 47% of the population and females 53%. Thaikkad has an average literacy rate of 86%, higher than the national average of 59.5%: male literacy is 86%, and female literacy is 86%. In Thaikkad, 10% of the population is under 6 years of age.

References

Cities and towns in Thrissur district